Central New York is the central region of New York State, including the following counties and cities:

Definitions 
The New York State Department of Transportation's definition of the Central/Eastern region includes the counties of Albany, Broome, Chenango, Columbia, Cortland, Delaware, Fulton, Greene, Herkimer, Madison, Montgomery, Oneida, Onondaga, Oswego, Otsego, Rensselaer, Saratoga, Schenectady, Schoharie, Sullivan, Ulster, and Washington, but does not commit itself to a definition of Central New York per se.

Cortland County and Tompkins County are often considered part of the New York State region called the Southern Tier; the ski country demarcation line runs through Cortland County. Tompkins County, which includes Ithaca at the edge of Cayuga Lake, is also considered part of the Finger Lakes. Oneida County and Herkimer County are often considered part of the New York State region called the Mohawk Valley, although the "Central New York" and "Mohawk Valley" definitions overlap. Only Onondaga County, Cayuga County, Oswego County and Madison County are always considered "Central New York".

History 
During the early historic period, the Iroquois (Haudenosaunee, Five Nations) successfully excluded Algonquian tribes from the region.

The Central New York Military Tract (land reserved for soldiers of the American Revolution) was located here.  Many towns derived from the tracts have classical names.

Higher education
Major colleges and universities in the region include  Syracuse University, SUNY Upstate Medical University,  Colgate University, Hamilton College, Le Moyne College, SUNY Oswego, SUNY Cortland, Utica College, SUNY ESF, Cazenovia College, SUNY Morrisville, Wells College and SUNY Polytechnic Institute.

Media 
Major newspapers in the region include the Oneida Daily Dispatch, Syracuse Post-Standard, Auburn Citizen, Rome Daily Sentinel, Ithaca Journal, and Utica Observer-Dispatch.

The region is served by several television stations based in Syracuse (including ABC affiliate WSYR-TV, NBC affiliate WSTM-TV, CBS affiliate WTVH, Fox affiliate WSYT and PBS member station WCNY-TV) and Utica (NBC/CBS affiliate WKTV, ABC affiliate WUTR and Fox TV affiliate WFXV).

Speech patterns 
Central New York is near the eastern edge of the dialect region known as the Inland North, which stretches as far west as Wisconsin. The region is characterized by the shift in vowel pronunciations known as the Northern Cities Vowel Shift, although in recent decades the shift has begun to fade out among younger generations.

This feature is shared with the rest of Upstate New York.

The word soda is used for soft drink in Central New York; this distinguishes it linguistically from Western New York, where pop is used.

See also 

 Syracuse metropolitan area

References

 
Regions of New York (state)
Upstate New York